The 2006-07 Portland Trail Blazers season was the team's 37th in the NBA. They began the season hoping to improve upon their 21-61 output from the previous season. They managed to improve by 11 games, finishing 32-50, but they failed to qualify for the playoffs.

NBA Draft

Roster

Roster Notes
 Forward Ime Udoka was born in the U.S., but represented Nigeria internationally.
 Forward Darius Miles missed the entire season due to a knee injury

Regular season

Season standings

z - clinched division title
y - clinched division title
x - clinched playoff spot

Record vs. opponents

Game log

Player statistics

Regular season 

|-
| 
| 63 || 22 || 22.1 || .503 || .000 || .722 || 5.0 || .4 || .3 || 1.2 || 9.0
|-
| 
| 50 || 3 || 8.9 || .358 || .262 || .792 || .9 || 1.4 || .3 || .0 || 3.3
|-
| 
| 55 || 1 || 22.6 || .426 || .364 || .833 || 1.5 || 1.5 || .9 || .1 || 8.9
|-
| 
| 14 || 1 || 11.8 || .425 || .273 || style=";"| .889 || 1.5 || .4 || .3 || .1 || 3.2
|-
| 
| 79 || style=";"| 79 || 33.6 || .454 || .350 || .871 || 2.6 || style=";"| 5.3 || 1.1 || .1 || 12.0
|-
| 
| 24 || 3 || 18.7 || .384 || .259 || .846 || 1.4 || 2.2 || .8 || .2 || 4.8
|-
| 
| 27 || 9 || 13.0 || .382 || .087 || .769 || 2.6 || .3 || .3 || .4 || 3.7
|-
| 
| 81 || 23 || 21.0 || style=";"| .504 || . || .541 || 6.1 || .4 || .3 || .8 || 6.5
|-
| 
| 67 || 1 || 22.9 || .434 || .270 || .790 || 3.2 || .8 || .9 || 1.1 || 9.6
|-
| 
| 43 || 43 || 16.3 || .474 || . || .370 || 3.9 || .3 || .2 || style=";"| 1.6 || 2.0
|-
| 
| 68 || 67 || style=";"| 35.7 || .467 || .292 || .819 || style=";"| 10.1 || 2.2 || .8 || .2 || style=";"| 23.6
|-
| 
| 1 || 0 || 1.0 || . || . || . || .0 || .0 || .0 || .0 || .0
|-
| 
| 67 || 1 || 12.9 || .423 || .282 || .808 || 1.4 || 3.3 || .5 || .0 || 3.7
|-
| 
| 57 || 55 || 35.4 || .456 || .377 || .838 || 4.4 || 4.0 || style=";"| 1.2 || .2 || 16.8
|-
| 
| 11 || 0 || 10.7 || .304 || . || .714 || 2.3 || .1 || .2 || .4 || 1.7
|-
| 
| 75 || 75 || 28.6 || .461 || style=";"| .406 || .742 || 3.7 || 1.5 || .9 || .2 || 8.4
|-
| 
| style=";"| 82 || 27 || 21.5 || .396 || .364 || .705 || 2.9 || .6 || .4 || .2 || 7.0
|}

Awards and records
 Brandon Roy, NBA All-Rookie Team 1st Team
 LaMarcus Aldridge, NBA All-Rookie Team 1st Team

Transactions

References

Portland Trail Blazers seasons
Portland Trail Blazers 2006
Port
Port
Port
Portland Trail Blazers